Mathías Daniel Pinto Mell (born July 13, 1998) is a Chilean footballer who currently plays as forward for Chilean club Ñublense.

Career
After becoming top goalscorer at all youth categories of Universidad de Chile, he debuted at the age of 16 years scoring one goal in a match against Santiago Morning at the Copa Chile. Later, he was loaned to Primera B clubs San Marcos and Melipilla.

On 2019 season, he became Top Goalscorer of the Primera B, scoring 14 goals. So, on 2020 he joined Primera División club Coquimbo Unido, playing also at the 2020 Copa Sudamericana.

International career
Pinto represented Chile U15 at the 2013 South American U15 Championship and Chile U17 at the 2015 FIFA U17 World Cup, playing one match against Nigeria U17. Also, he represented Chile U23 at the 2019 Maurice Revello Tournament, playing three matches and scoring one goal.

Career statistics

Club
 

Notes

International

Honours
Universidad de Chile
 Primera División (1): 2017-C

Individual
 Primera B de Chile Top Scorer (1): 2019

References

External links
 

Living people
1998 births
Chilean footballers
Chilean Primera División players
Universidad de Chile footballers
San Marcos de Arica footballers
Deportes Melipilla footballers
Ñublense footballers
Coquimbo Unido footballers
Association football forwards
Primera B de Chile players